All the Way Home | When A Black Family Moves Next Door is a 1957 documentary short film directed by well-known documentary film director Lee R. Bobker and produced by Nathan Zucker. Shot in black and white, the film was written by famed writer and poet Muriel Rukeyser. Critical essayist Kenneth Rexroth considered Rukeyser the greatest poet of her "exact generation." The film was produced by Dynamic Films, Inc., a New York-based film production, documentary and theatrical film and TV production company founded in 1948.

With a runtime of 28 minutes, the film depicts an elderly white family in the 1950s selling their home. When the family's patriarch shows the home to an interested African American family, neighbors within the all-white community begin to gossip. The elderly white family became the target of harassment and threats by bigoted neighbors, who do not want African American families to move into the neighborhood.

This film is notable among a genre of documentary films aimed at curbing white American anxiety and supremacist violence against racial desegregation and racial integration in the 1950s and 1960s. It serves as an earlier anti-discrimination narrative and racial sounding post in the spirit of the noted documentary, "Building the American Dream: Levittown, NY", which discussed Levittown, New York, the prototypical Post-World War II tract home suburb built in the late 1940s that excluded African Americans via restricted covenants and supremacist activism.

Plot

The film begins with a male narrator's depiction of a quiet, attractive, well-manicured suburban American neighborhood in the 1950s.

Ed, an elderly white gentleman, nails a "For Sale" sign post in the front yard of his single family home. Suddenly, a well-dressed African American man in a high quality late-model automobile drives up into Ed's driveway. After greeting Ed, the African American man is joined by his wife and daughter. They all enter Ed's home for a grand tour.

Nearby, two white female neighbors begin to gossip franticly, lamenting that Ed may sell the property to an African American family. One of the female neighbors rushes home to call her husband Dick. Soon after, neighbors begin incessant telephone calls to each other's households, fearful of African American incursion in their community.

After the American-American family departs Ed's home, Ed and his wife reminisce on life in their beloved home and neighborhood. When the telephone rings, Ed's wife answers it, put off by what appears to be racially hostile complaint from one of her neighbors.

The next day, Ed stand at a local bus stop with Tom, a neighbor and fellow lodge member. Before the bus arrives, Tom expresses racial animosity towards Ed for inviting an African American family to view Ed's home. Upset, Ed rushes over to the office of Ted, a local real estate broker. Ted, who appears to have a racial bias against African Americans, asks Ed to take down his "For Sale" sign and allow Ted to sell the house to the "right buyer".

Later that day, Ed shares his frustration with his wife, his daughter and son-in-law, Bob. Suddenly, a car aggressively pulls up in Ed's front yard and throws a can of black paint onto the "For Sale" sign. Some of the paint lands onto the dress of Ed's young granddaughter, Laurie. Ed's young grandson, Bobby, attempts to chase the car as it flees down the street.

The next day, Ed stands in a local school yard watching children play. He overhears two neighbors expressing racial animosity against African-American homeownership in their predominately white neighborhood.

Disgruntled, Ted visits a prominent local banker, Ralph. Ted complains to Ralph that Ed will set off a negative chain reaction of African-American homeownership that will lower housing values. Ralph, who considers himself a "practical man", cites studies demonstrating that land values tend to go up when African-American families integrate communities. Undeterred by Ralph's pronouncements, Ted demands that Ralph convince his bank modify its real estate loan policy to curb loans to African-Americans, all to reassure "homeowners of this community, and the merchants and the service companies."

Ed's wife visits her local church minister to discuss recent occurrences in light of her biased upbringing and impulse to do the right thing by the African-American family and their young daughter. Her minister shares his church's position against ignorance and hate.

Undeterred, Ted reconvenes a follow-up meeting at Ralph's bank. Ralph reads Ted his bank's policy: "This bank is in the business of making sound loans properly secured." Ted balks at Ralph's policy pronouncement, warning Ralph that their white neighbors will flee the community, turning it into a slum. Ralph rebuts Ted, reminding him that a man's ability to pay his debts should never have anything to do with the color of his skin or where he came from. Disgruntled, Ted alludes to Ralph that he will not allow bank policy to keep him from selling real estate to white people or helping his neighbors sell their homes and relocate.

In a final scene, various members of the community meet to debate how to protect land values and thwart undesirables from moving into their community. One of them mention that Ted is already meeting with various white residents to help them sell their homes. Ralph retorts, advising the attendees that homeownership should be focused on a person's worth and ability to afford that property, "not the color of the skin, their religion, or where his parents come from."

Cast and Crew

 Lee R. Bobker - Director
 Muriel Rukeyser - Writer
 Nathan Zucker - Producer 
 Ray E. Long - Director of Photography
 Yoshio Kishi - Film Editor 
 Jack Fitzstephens (credited as John J. Fitzstephens) - Production Manager. Nominated for a "Best Sound" British Film Award for the 1975 American biographical crime drama film Dog Day Afternoon", directed by Sidney Lumet. 
 James Townsend - Sound Recordist
 William Schwartz - Sound Recordist

Credited 
 Charles Abrams	...	gratefully acknowledged assistance: New York State Commission Against Discrimination
 Algernon D. Black	...	gratefully acknowledged assistance: National Committee Against Discrimination in Housing
 Oscar Cohen	...	gratefully acknowledged assistance: Anti-Defamation League of B'Nai Brith
 Lillian Hatcher	...	gratefully acknowledged assistance: Fair Practices and Anti-Discrimination Department, United Auto Workers
 Frank Smith Horne (credited as "Frank S. Horne"	...	gratefully acknowledged assistance: New York Commission on Intergroup Relations
 Reginald Johnson	...	gratefully acknowledged assistance: National Urban League, Inc.
 Madison S. Jones	...	gratefully acknowledged assistance: National Association for the Advancement of Colored People
 Alfred S. Kramer	...	gratefully acknowledged assistance: National Council of Churches of Christ in the U.S.A. (as Rev. Alfred S. Kramer)
 Harold A. Lett	...	gratefully acknowledged assistance: Division Against Discrimination, State of New Jersey
 Edward Rutledge	...	gratefully acknowledged assistance: New York State Commission Against Discrimination
 James H. Scheuer	...	gratefully acknowledged assistance: Housing Advisory Council, New York State Commission Against Discrimination
 George Sehermer	...	gratefully acknowledged assistance: Philadelphia Commission on Human Relations
 Galen Weaver	...	gratefully acknowledged assistance: Congregational Christian Churches (as Rev. Galen Weaver)

References

Documentary films about African Americans
1957 short films
American short documentary films
1957 films
1950s American films
1950s short documentary films